Robert Kurnicki (born 27 March 1965 in Zabrze, Poland) is a retired Polish-German sprinter who specialized in the 200 metres.

At the 1993 World Championships he finished sixth in the 4x100 metres relay, together with teammates Marc Blume, Michael Huke and Steffen Görmer.

His personal best time is 20.46 seconds, achieved in July 1993 in Duisburg. He represented the sports club TV 01 Wattenscheid.

References

1965 births
Living people
German male sprinters
German male hurdlers
German people of Polish descent
Sportspeople from Zabrze